Éric Hélary (born 10 August 1966) is a professional racing driver from Paris. His career has encompassed single seater formulae, endurance sports car racing, and touring cars. He won the French Formula Three Championship in 1990 and is best known for his win at the 24 Hours of Le Mans in 1993. He was champion 2011 of Euro Racecar.

Single seater career
Hélary's racing career began in a conventional way, with a period of karting between 1981 and 1984. He progressed to French Formula Ford in 1987 and won the title in the following year, then progressed to French Formula Three in 1989 and won that title in his second year. His single seater career ended in International Formula 3000.

Sports cars

Hélary first participated in sports car racing in the Peugeot Spyder Cup one-make championship in 1992 and secured the drivers' title in 1993. In the same year, he made his 24 Hours of Le Mans début in the factory Peugeot 905 alongside Christophe Bouchut and Geoff Brabham. He had previously driven this car with Bouchut in 1992.

After a period in touring cars, Hélary returned to endurance racing in the FIA GT Championship in 1996, driving a Chrysler Viper. He did not compete again in sports cars until a one-off return to FIA GTs in 2001. His next participation in endurance racing was another single race, this time in the FIA Sportscar Championship in 2003, driving a Pescarolo Courage-Peugeot alongside Nicolas Minassian. He made another one-off appearance with Pescarolo in the 2004 Le Mans Endurance Series and returned to the series for a full season in 2006. He is currently employed by Peugeot as its official test driver for the Peugeot 908 HDi FAP.

Touring cars
Hélary made his touring car début in the French Supertourisme championship in 1994, driving for Opel. He was classified fifth in the standings and improved to the championship runner-up position in 1995. He made a departure into ice racing during the winter of 1996 by entering the Trophée Andros with Opel. He adapted well and finished in fourth position over all, then finished second over all in the 1997 season.

Hélary spent the remainder of 1997 working as a test driver for BMW's Super Tourenwagen Cup team in Germany and then returned to Opel for two years of racing in the series in 1998 and 1999. When the Deutsche Tourenwagen Masters was relaunched in 2000, Hélary and Opel remained together. He made one more appearance in the DTM in 2002 before returning to French Supertourisme for a third season, in which he finished fourth in the standings. A full season of sports car racing intervened before Hélary's next, and so far last, touring car programme. 2005 brought a fourth season in French Supertourisme as well as competing in one round of the World Touring Car Championship in a Peugeot 407 for Peugeot Sport Denmark.

Racing record

24 Hours of Le Mans results

Complete French Supertouring Championship results 
(key)

Complete Super Tourenwagen Cup results
(key) (Races in bold indicate pole position) (Races in italics indicate fastest lap)

Complete Deutsche Tourenwagen Masters results
(key)

† — Retired, but was classified as he completed 90% of the winner's race distance.

Complete World Touring Car Championship results
(key) (Races in bold indicate pole position) (Races in italics indicate fastest lap)

NASCAR
(key) (Bold – Pole position awarded by qualifying time. Italics – Pole position earned by points standings or practice time. * – Most laps led.)

K&N Pro Series East

Whelen Euro Series - Elite 1

References

External links
Official website 
Driver profile Speedsportmag.com Retrieved on September 11, 2007.
 

1966 births
Living people
French racing drivers
French Formula Three Championship drivers
World Touring Car Championship drivers
Deutsche Tourenwagen Masters drivers
International Formula 3000 drivers
24 Hours of Le Mans drivers
24 Hours of Le Mans winning drivers
American Le Mans Series drivers
European Le Mans Series drivers
World Sportscar Championship drivers
24 Hours of Spa drivers
NASCAR drivers
Oreca drivers
Schnitzer Motorsport drivers
Toyota Gazoo Racing drivers
Peugeot Sport drivers
BMW M drivers
Pescarolo Sport drivers
Larbre Compétition drivers
DAMS drivers